La Rambla is a street in central Barcelona.

La Rambla can be crowded, especially during the height of the tourist season. Its popularity with tourists has affected the character of the street, which has shifted in composition to pavement cafes and souvenir kiosks. It has also suffered from the attention of pickpockets.

The Spanish poet Federico García Lorca once said that La Rambla was "the only street in the world which I wish would never end."

Orientation 

La Rambla can be considered a series of shorter streets, each differently named, hence the plural form  (the original Catalan form; in Spanish it is ). The street is successively called:
  – the site of the  fountain
  – the site of the former Jesuit University, whose only remainder is the Church of Bethlehem
  (or ) – the site of an open-air flower market
  – the site of a former Capuchin monastery, now dominated by the Liceu opera-house
  – an arts center named after the convent of St. Monica.

The  retains a labyrinthine street plan, with small squares and streets, many of which connect onto the Rambla. Further into the  can be found the Cathedral of Santa Eulàlia and the  that houses the buildings of the Generalitat of Catalonia and Barcelona's City Council.

To the west of La Rambla is the rather different  quarter. Outside the city's earliest walls, this area was originally the site of various religious and medical institutions. Later factories grew up along with housing for the workers, whilst the proximity to the port led to the area becoming known for its nightlife and clubs, as well as prostitution and crime.

At the southern end of the Rambla is the Christopher Columbus Monument and the Port Vell, the old port of Barcelona, now largely given over to pleasure craft. Near to the port end of the Rambla are the Royal Dockyards, which house a maritime museum specifically devoted to naval history in the Mediterranean.

Extensions at either end of the Rambla also carry the name Rambla, but are not normally considered part of La Rambla itself. To the north, the  extends into the  district.

History

The course of La Rambla was originally a sewage-filled stream, usually dry but an important drain for the heavy rainwater flowing from the Collserola hills during spring and autumn. (from the Arabic  'sand', is Catalan for "wadi". The name of the city of Ramla in Israel is derived from the same origin). It separated the walled city on its north-east bank from the settlements of El Raval ("the suburb") on its south-west.

In the year 1377, construction started on an extension of the city walls to include La Rambla and El Raval. In 1440, the stream was diverted to run outside the new walls, and La Rambla gradually started turning into a street.

Over the next few centuries, La Rambla became an established center of Barcelona's urban life, serving as a long wide thoroughfare used for festivals, markets, and sports. Several large religious establishments were also built along the street during this period. These include the Jesuit Bethlehem monastery and college (1553), of which just the later church remains; the Carmelite St. Joseph's monastery, on the site of the current Boqueria market; and a Capuchin monastery at the lower end of the street.

In 1703, the first of the trees lining La Rambla were planted. They were 280 birch trees and later on those were replaced by elm trees. In 1832, some acacias were planted and the currently standing plane trees started to be the common tree from 1859.

Various conflicts over recent centuries took their toll on La Rambla's religious buildings, most notably the St. James's Night riots in 1835, when revolutionaries burned the monasteries and churches and killed a number of friars; and the Spanish Civil War in 1936–39, when Barcelona came under the control of anarchists who again targeted religious buildings and personnel, as well as being damaged by artillery and air attacks on the area from pro-Franco forces.

However animal protection laws made it difficult for the market to continue. After years of fighting the legislation, the market was forced to close.

On 17 August 2017, many people were struck by a van deliberately driven down the sidewalk on La Rambla in a terrorist attack, causing 15 deaths and at least 100 injuries.

Sights

The tree-lined central promenade of La Rambla is crowded during the day and until late in the night. Its origins as a watercourse are reflected in the paving design, which appears to ripple like water. Along the promenade's length are kiosks that sell newspapers and souvenirs, other kiosks selling flowers, street traders, performers, and pavement cafes and bars.

Along the Rambla are historic buildings such as the Palace of the Virreina and the  Theater, in which operas and ballets are staged. The  market opens off the Rambla and is one of the city's foremost tourist landmarks, housing a very diverse selection of goods.

One of the side streets, which is only a few meters long, leads to the Royal Square, a plaza with palm trees and porticoed buildings containing many pubs and restaurants, and where stamp and coin collectors gather on the weekends.

Culture 

The Rambla is the location for several of Barcelona's cultural establishments, including:

In the  can be found a pavement mosaic created in 1971, by the famed artist Joan Miró.

Transport 

The most obvious transport mode on La Rambla is its heavy flow of pedestrians, who largely use the wide central pedestrianized area. This is flanked by two narrow service roads, which in turn are flanked by narrow pedestrian walkways in front of the buildings. Despite its length, no vehicular traffic is permitted to cross the central pedestrian walkway.

Line L3 of the Barcelona Metro runs beneath the length of La Rambla, with stations at:

 , in front of the opera house , serves the central section of La Rambla. 

Three Barcelona Bus lines operate along the service roads flanking La Rambla during the day (numbers 14, 59 and 91), whilst three different night time services also operate along La Rambla (numbers N9, N12 and N15).

Redevelopment 
In 2017 the city of Barcelona approved a plan to redevelop the famous street giving it a new image and function. Construction for the redevelopment is slated to begin in late 2022. The redevelopment budget is approximately  €45 million and will be carried out in stages. More space will be made for pedestrians by reducing the number of car lanes. Traffic will also be restricted to use only by service vehicle and people who live in the area. The general idea is to create a "green space" that will be more welcoming to locals and tourists alike.

See also 

 Street names in Barcelona
 Urban planning of Barcelona

References

External links

 Amics de la Rambla – Association of La Rambla

 
Streets in Barcelona
Barcelona
Catalonia
Shopping districts and streets in Catalonia
Ciutat Vella
Busking venues
Tourist attractions in Barcelona
Red-light districts in Spain